Helen Lydia Kamakaʻeha Liliʻuokalani Kawānanakoa (July 22, 1905 – May 19, 1969) was a member of the House of Kawānanakoa and the second daughter of David Kawānanakoa and Abigail Campbell Kawānanakoa.

Early life

Born July 22, 1905, Liliʻuokalani Kawānanakoa was named after Queen Liliʻuokalani, the last monarch of Hawaii. Having been born after the abolition of the monarchy, she had no official royal title; however, she was still known by many in the Hawaiian community as Princess Liliuokalani.

She attended a convent school in San Francisco. During her youth, she was known as the "flapper" princess and sported the then-fashionable bobbed hair. Her siblings were David Kalākaua Kawānanakoa and Abigail Kapiʻolani Kawānanakoa.

Marriages and family 
Liliʻuokalani married five times. Her first marriage was to Dr. William Jeremiah Ellerbrock on January 17, 1925, at Honolulu. The couple had one daughter before divorcing in 1927:
 Abigail Kinoiki Kekaulike Kawānanakoa (1926–2022).

Following the divorce, Abigail was adopted by Liliʻuokalani's mother. Her second marriage was to Charles James Brenham at Niu, August 11, 1928; they also divorced. Her third husband was newspaperman Clark Lee, whom she married in 1938; Lee died of a heart attack in 1953. Her fourth husband, whom she married in 1954, was Charles E. Morris Jr; the couple divorced in 1959, and remarried in 1968.

Legacy and death 
She was the founder of the Kona Hawaiian Civic Club in 1952 and was the founder and First President of Friends of ʻIolani Palace from 1966 to 1969.

She died of cancer at her home in Waialae, Honolulu, on May 19, 1969. At her request, her funeral was a private ceremony with none of the pomp or displays of former Hawaiian royal funerals. She is buried at Nuʻuanu Memorial Park.

References 

1905 births
1969 deaths
House of Kawānanakoa
Pretenders to the Hawaiian throne
Hawaiian princesses
Deaths from cancer in Hawaii
Burials at Nuʻuanu Memorial Park
American monarchists